Stine Renate Håheim (born 13 May 1984) is a Norwegian politician (representing the Labour Party). She is from Valdres, Oppland. She was a municipal councillor for Nord-Aurdal 2003–2007, and a member of Oppland county council between 2007 and 2009. Håheim was a central member of Arbeidernes ungdomsfylking (Workers' Youth League or AUF) from 2006 to 2010. At the 2009 Norwegian parliamentary election, she was the party's 4th candidate for Oppland, and from October 2009, she replaced Rigmor Aasrud, as Aasrud become the Minister of Government Administration and Church Affairs, and had to leave her seat in the Storting (Parliament).

Håheim studied at the Lektorstudiet at Universitetet i Oslo, a professional course based around teaching studies.

On 22 July 2011 she escaped unharmed from the Utøya shooting massacre.

Origin of quote on CNN 

She was interviewed by CNN's Richard Quest on 23 July 2011 where she phrased the words "If one man can create that much hate, you can only imagine how much love we as a togetherness can create." This phrase was later quoted by prime minister Jens Stoltenberg during the memorial service on Sunday 24 July 2011, attributed to "the AUF girl who was interviewed by CNN", slightly rephrased due to translation back in Norwegian (here in English translation): If one man can show so much hate, think how much love we could show together.

According to Håheim herself in an interview with the Norwegian newspaper Verdens Gang she attributes the original formulation to a good friend, Helle Gannestad.

Verdens Gang later updated the article The Love Message is Spreading in All Channels on 25 July 2011 with the information that the Love Quote correctly shall be attributed to Helle Gannestad, the good friend of Håheim. The original phrasing in English translation is as follows: When one man could cause so much evil - think about how much love we can create together.

Storting committees 

2009–2013 member of Justice Committee

References

External links 
 Stine Renate Håheim at Stortinget
 Stine Renate Håheim's blog

Members of the Storting
People from Valdres
1984 births
Living people
Labour Party (Norway) politicians
Women members of the Storting
Local politicians in Norway
21st-century Norwegian politicians
21st-century Norwegian women politicians
Survivors of the 2011 Norway attacks